South Isis is a rural locality in the Bundaberg Region, Queensland, Australia.

History 
Isis South Provisional School opened on 7 February 1887. On 1 January 1909 it became Isis South State School. It closed on 9 March 1936.

References 

Bundaberg Region
Localities in Queensland